Parmacella gervaisii is an extinct species of air-breathing land snail, a terrestrial pulmonate gastropod mollusk in the family Parmacellidae.

Parmacella gervaisii is considered to be extinct.

Distribution 
This species was endemic to the area near Arles, France.

Description 
The animal is brown with olive green hue. The shell is solid, greenish yellow, shiny, entirely opaque, concentrically striated, with 1.25 whorls, anterior part is 3 times larger than posterior part, rounded. The length of the shell is 11–12 mm. The width of the shell is 7 mm. The height of the shell is 2-2.3 mm.

Ecology 
It was observed to occur almost always in pairs in April.

References
This article incorporates public domain text from the reference.

External links 
  text about Parmacella gervaisii in French, but the image is drawing of the Parmacella valenciennii

Parmacellidae
Extinct gastropods
Gastropods described in 1850
Endemic molluscs of Metropolitan France